Gerety is a surname. It may refer to:

Anne Gerety (1926-2003), American actress
Mary Frances Gerety, American advertisement copywriter
Megan Gerety (born 1971), American alpine ski racer
Peter Gerety (born 1940), American actor
Peter Leo Gerety  (1912–2016), American prelate of the Roman Catholic Church
Tom Gerety, lawyer, philosopher, school administrator